Royal Princess may refer to:

Ships
 A ship named "Royal Princess", see List of ships named Royal Princess
 Royal-class cruise ship; aka Royal Princess-class cruise ship,

Princess Cruises ships
Royal Princess is a name carried by several ships operated by Princess Cruises:
 , in service as Royal Princess from 1984 to 2005
 Azamara Pursuit, in service as Royal Princess from 2007 until 2011

Other uses
 A princess who is of a kingly ruling house in power, as opposed to a princess of a pretender house, a princess of an imperial dynasty or celebrity princess
 Dusit International, operator of Thai hotels named "Royal Princess"

See also

 Princess Royal (disambiguation)
 Regal Princess
 
 
 
 Princess (disambiguation)
 Royal (disambiguation)